Jim Youngs (born October 13, 1956) is an American actor.

Early life 
Youngs was born in Old Bethpage, New York, the brother of actor John Savage and journalist Robin Young.

Career
He appeared in such films as The Wanderers, Footloose, Out of Control, Youngblood, The Price Of Life, Hotshot (1987), Nobody's Fool, You Talkin' To Me (1987) and Skeeter.

In 1990, he portrayed Michael Santana's cop brother-in-law "Richard Burns" in Wiseguy season 4 episode "Point of No Return". In 1994, he portrayed "Benson" in Babylon 5 episode "And the Sky Full of Stars". In 2012, Youngs was mentioned in speculative reporting that he would reunite with Tony Ganios, his co-star in The Wanderers, in a teen-sex comedy to be called Daddies' Girls. Gainos and his Porky's co-stars launched a Kickstarter campaign in an effort to produce the film.

Filmography

Film

Television

References

External links

1956 births
Living people
American male film actors
American male television actors
Male actors from New York (state)
People from Oyster Bay (town), New York